Philadelphia  or Philadelpheia, was a town of ancient Cilicia, and later of Isauria. It was located in the interior of Cilicia Aspera, on the river Calycadnus, above Aphrodisias. It became an episcopal see; no longer the site of a residential bishop, it remains under the name Philadelphia Minor, a titular see of the Roman Catholic Church.

Its site is tentatively located near İmşi Ören in Karaman Province, Turkey.

References

Populated places in ancient Cilicia
Populated places in ancient Isauria
Former populated places in Turkey
Roman towns and cities in Turkey
Populated places of the Byzantine Empire
History of Karaman Province
Catholic titular sees in Asia